Swiss Cottage is a Grade II listed building in the English village of Rievaulx, North Yorkshire. It dates to at least the 17th century, with earlier origins.

References

External links

 
Grade II listed buildings in North Yorkshire
Grade II listed houses
Houses completed in the 17th century
Houses in North Yorkshire